Catocala obscena is a moth in the family Erebidae first described by Sergei Alphéraky in 1879. It is found in Korea and China.

Subspecies
Catocala obscena obscena
Catocala obscena baihi Ishizuka, 2003 (China: Shaanxi)
Catocala obscena bukeihi Ishizuka, 2003 (China: Yunnan)

References

obscena
Moths described in 1879
Moths of Asia